André Honnorat (10 December 1868 – 24 July 1950) was a French politician. He served as a member of the Chamber of Deputies from 1910 to 1921, and as a member of the French Senate from 1921 to 1945, representing Basses-Alpes.

Together with  Émile Deutsch de la Meurthe, he created the Cité Internationale Universitaire de Paris (CIUP), and there is also a residence there which is named after him.

References

1868 births
1950 deaths
Politicians from Paris
Independent Radical politicians
Democratic Republican Alliance politicians
Members of the 10th Chamber of Deputies of the French Third Republic
Members of the 11th Chamber of Deputies of the French Third Republic
Members of the 12th Chamber of Deputies of the French Third Republic
French Senators of the Third Republic
Senators of Alpes-de-Haute-Provence